The Wangenheim Palace (German: Wangenheimpalais) is a building in the Mitte district of Hanover. From 1863 to 1913, it was the town hall and seat of the city administration of Hanover. Today it is the seat of the Lower Saxony Ministry of Economic Affairs.

History 
The Wangenheim Palace was built in the years 1829-1832 according to plans by the Hanoverian court builder Georg Ludwig Friedrich Laves. Georg Moller is believed to have had an advisory role in the design of the building. Georg Christian von Wangenheim commissioned the construction of building and used it as a residence until his death. A winter garden was also added to the building by Laves in 1844.

In 1851, George V of Hanover ascended the throne. Subsequently, the building was acquired by the crown and made into a residence palace. George V lived in the palace for a period of ten years.

In 1862, the building was acquired by the City of Hanover, which hired Ludwig Droste to oversee a reconstruction project for the building. The following year, the city administration left the Old Town Hall and moved into the palace. It was used as the town hall and seat of the city administration until 1913, when the town hall moved into the newly created New Town Hall diagonally opposite from the palace.

During the Second World War, the palace was destroyed in one of the air raids on Hanover in 1943. It burned down, but was rebuilt a few years later and used for city purposes. After the demolition of the old Brückmühle water mill, which had been in use since the Middle Ages, the city coat of arms from the mill was installed in the gable of the facade of the Wangenheim Palace.

Since 1957, the Lower Saxony Ministry of Economic Affairs has used the palace as its headquarters.  From 1994 to 2013, there was a bus stop designed in the shape of a sailboat by Italian designer Massimo Iosa Ghini opposite the palace, which was a part of the BUSSTOPS art project. This was moved to the opposite side of the street in front of the Museum August Kestner in 2013.

Gallery

External links 

 Description of the Wangenheim Palace from the Lower Saxony Ministry of Economic Affairs
 Description of building and coat of arms
 Short description from hannover.de

References 

Hanover
1829 establishments